Fikentscher is a surname. Notable people with the surname include:

 Rüdiger Fikentscher (born 1941), German physician, politician, and academic
 Wolfgang Fikentscher (1928–2015), German jurist and legal anthropologist

Surnames of German origin